The Wartburg was a car marque known for its East German manufactured models, but has its origins dating to 1898. The name derives from Wartburg Castle on one of the hills overlooking the town of Eisenach where the cars were made. From the 1950s, Wartburgs were a three-cylinder two-stroke engine with only seven major moving parts (three pistons, three connecting rods and one crankshaft). Production ended in April 1991, and the factory was acquired by Opel.

History

First usage of name

The marque dates back to 1898 when a car made by Automobilwerk Eisenach was named the Wartburgwagen. It consisted of a two-seating cane chair, four mudguards, two headlamps, and a two-cylinder, 765-cc engine. The name was dropped in 1904 when the company changed hands but re-appeared briefly in the early 1930s on the BMW 3/15 DA-3 Wartburg, which was BMW's first sports car.

Main usage of name
The name was revived in 1956 by VEB Automobilwerk Eisenach and given to an updated version of their IFA F9 car which had been in production since 1950. The new car had a more powerful version of the three-cylinder two-stroke engine driving the front wheels and a completely new body. By this time, Germany had been divided into two countries (the West and the East) and the Wartburg factory was in the communist East (GDR).

Exports to West Germany began in 1958, and by the early 1960s the car was exported to other countries, including the United Kingdom and United States. Right hand drive models were first manufactured in 1963 and exported to Cyprus, with British buyers being introduced to the car in 1964. However, just 550 examples (450 saloons and 100 estates) were sold in the UK. These were two-tone models sold at the same price as a basic British Mini, appealing mostly to older people.

The 311 model was manufactured in a number of variations, including pickup, estate, and two-seater roadster. A convertible was advertised in the GDR in 1957 but its production never exceeded 350 units.

The engine was enlarged to 992 cc in 1962 and a completely new body was manufactured after 1966. This version, the 353, was sold as the Wartburg Knight in several countries, including the UK, where the estate model was sold as the Tourist. It remained on sale until 1976, by which time nearly 20,000 had been sold. This marked the end of right-hand drive Wartburgs, but left-hand drive versions continued to be imported to the UK and at least one model was converted to right-hand drive.

Also, in 1966, the gearbox gained synchromesh on all speeds and was designed to freewheel as a fuel efficiency and engine protection measure, which meant that unless the freewheel feature was disabled by a lever beneath the steering column, the car did not benefit from engine braking. Because the engine was a two stroke unit, it relied on the passage of the petrol mixture (two-stroke oil and petrol, at a ratio of 1:50) to lubricate the engine. With the freewheel device disengaged, the engine could be starved of lubricant and seize on long down-hill runs unless the throttle was opened briefly from time to time. Nevertheless, disengaging the freewheel device was recommended to give engine braking in snowy or icy conditions.

There are four editions of Wartburg 353:

Wartburg 353 from 1966

Wartburg 353W from 1975

Wartburg 353W from 1983

Wartburg 353S from 1985
There are three models of Wartburg 353 - Limousine (sedan), Tourist (combi) and Trans (pickup). The 353W modification had a new, round-shaped dashboard and black-coloured grille. It was also fitted with disc brakes on the front axle. The 353S modification featured new rectangular headlights integrated into the grille of a new shape. In the De Luxe version you can see electronic ignition, 5-speed gearbox, front and back fog lights, alarm system and central lock door. Usually this model can reach around 150-155 km/h. Moreover, the radiator was moved from behind the engine (353, 353W) to the classic position behind the grille.

Fuel economy was barely acceptable for run-about driving. The offer of Volkswagen to move a surplus engine assembly line to the GDR, to be paid off by manufacture, was accepted by the government on account of fuel economy. In 1988, the new model Wartburg 1.3 therefore replaced the old model 353S, featuring the reliable though bulky 4-stroke engine from the Volkswagen Golf. Being larger than the compact 2-stroke unit, this needed considerable reconstruction of the engine compartment.

Demise
The VW engine gave 64 horsepower. The new Wartburg was short-lived, its end being sealed by German reunification; production was inefficient and could not compete with West-German manufacturers. Production ended in April 1991, and the factory was acquired by Opel.

There are still some cars in a roadworthy condition, and Wartburg owners' clubs exist throughout Europe. Some Wartburgs are still used as rally cars.

Derivatives
The Melkus RS 1000 used a mid-mounted three-cylinder two-stroke engine from the Wartburg 353.

Models
311, 1956–65
313 (Roadster), 1957–60
312, 1965–67
353 (Knight), 1965–89
1.3, 1988–91

Gallery

References

External links 

UK-based official Wartburg, Trabant and IFA owners' club
History of Wartburg – long introduction
Video: How Wartburgs were made
IFA Mobile 2takt Vereniging – the so-called oldest association of East German cars
Wartburgpage – acts and images
Polish Wartburg Club – Polski Klub Wartburga
New Wartburg V8 – German report on Eisenach Online

Defunct motor vehicle manufacturers of Germany
Industrieverband Fahrzeugbau
Car manufacturers of Germany
Eisenach
Transport in East Germany
Car manufacturers of East Germany